In Islamic history, Ali is the second most influential person about whom as much has been written in islamic languages after Mohammad. Ali is widely revered and honored by Muslims. Almost every Sufi order traces its origin to Muhammad through Ali. One of the first Muslims and foremost Ulema (Islamic scholars), he was knowledgeable in matters of religious belief and Islamic jurisprudence, as well as in the history of the Muslim community. He was known for his bravery and courage. Muslims honor Muhammad, Ali, and other companions of the prophet and add honorific interjections after their names.

Ali's birthday is celebrated on 13th of Rajab by Shia Muslims to remember their first Imam & his death is remembered and mourned from 19th to 21st of Ramadan which is the anniversary of his assassination and martyrdom. The Ziyarat of the Tomb of Imam Ali in the Imam Ali Mosque is a usual religious tradition among Shias and Sufis.

Poems

Sufis have glorified Ali in their works. For example, Rumi says in Masnavi:
The man spat in Ali's pure face, the pride
of every saint and prophet far and wide
The moon itself prostrates before this face...

Sufis recite Manqabat Ali in the praise of Ali (Maula Ali), after Hamd and Na`at in their Qawwali.

Footnotes

External links
 Ali ibn Abi Talib by Ismail K. Poonawala and E. Kohlberg in Encyclopædia Iranica
 Ali, article on Encyclopædia Britannica Online
 Hazrat Ali ibn Abi Talib (ra) - alislam.org

Ali
600 births
661 deaths
7th-century caliphs
7th-century judges
7th-century rulers in Asia
Arab generals
Arab politicians
Assassinated caliphs
Assassinated Shia imams
Deified people
Family of Muhammad
Arab Muslims
Deaths by blade weapons
Islamic philosophers
Writers of the medieval Islamic world
People of the First Fitna
People from Mecca
Rashidun caliphs
Sahabah martyrs
Sahabah who participated in the battle of Uhud
Sahabah who participated in the battle of Badr
Shia imams
Zaydi imams
Twelve Imams